Sam Cook may refer to:

Sam C. Cook (1855–1924), associate justice of the Supreme Court of Mississippi 
Sam Cook (cricketer, born 1921) (1921–1996), English cricketer
Sam Cook (cricketer, born 1997), English cricketer
Sam Cook (rugby league) (born 1993), New Zealand rugby league player

See also
Sam Cooke (1931–1964), American singer
Samuel Cook (disambiguation)
Sam Koch (born 1982), pronounced Cook, American football punter